The Eyyub Sultan Mosque is a mosque currently under construction in Strasbourg, Grand Est, France.

History
The construction of the mosque started in 2017. The construction cost of the building is EUR25 million. The mosque will be led by Milli Görüs Islamic Confederation.

Architecture
The mosque is being built at a total area of 7,000 m2. The minarets stand at a height of 36 m. The mosque will have a capacity of 2,500 worshippers indoor and another 2,500 on its outdoor area.

Transportation
The mosque will be accessible within talking distance west of Krimmeri-Meinau station of SNCF.

See also
 Islam in France
 List of mosques in France

References

Buildings and structures in Strasbourg
Mosques in France
Proposed mosques